Cyrtotyphlus elegans is a species of rove beetles in the subfamily Leptotyphlinae.

References

External links 
 

Leptotyphlinae